Romanovka is a village in the Chüy Region of Kyrgyzstan. Its population was 3,185 in 2021.

References

Populated places in Chüy Region